Zalmon Gilbert Simmons Sr. (September 10, 1828February 10, 1910) was a businessman, manufacturer, Wisconsin legislator, and mayor of Kenosha, Wisconsin.

Early life 
Born September 10, 1828, to Ezra and Mary Gilbert Simmons in Euphrates, Montgomery County, New York, Soon after Zalmon was born, the family moved to Oneida County, New York, and established a farm. After 1839, the family moved to Benton Township, Lake County, Illinois, where Zalmon attended common schools during the winter months. On June 12, 1843, the family moved to Southport (now Kenosha), Wisconsin. Simmons came to Kenosha with US$3 when he was 15 or 21 years of age. His brother was Rouse Simmons who also served in the Wisconsin State Assembly for Kenosha. Rouse was a member of the Republican party and served in 1875.

Simmons completed his schooling in Kenosha and then worked as a teacher between 18 and 21 years of age.

Business career 
Among his pursuits, Simmons was the president of the First National Bank of Kenosha, Northwest Telegraphy Company, and the Rock Island Railway Company. In 1859, he was the president of the Kenosha and Rockford Railway Company, while also working at the Wisconsin State Telegraph Company.

Merchant 
Beginning at the age of 21, Simmons worked as a general store clerk for pioneer Seth Doan for $200 per year. Due to Mr. Doan's ill health, Simmons ran the store after six months employment. He bought the store after working there 16 or 18 months. He ran the store successfully for 12 years, until he sought other interests.

Telegraph 
Simmons acquired half interest in the Wisconsin State Telegraph Company in 1856, became a director, and in December 1858 became its secretary and treasurer. In 1864, he was made president. The company became the North-West Telegraphy company when it merged with the Minnesota State Telegraph Company in 1865. Simmons was elected president of the new company. He remained president until 1881, when the company leased its lines to the Western Union Telegraph Company. At the time that Simmons invested in the company, it was almost worthless and had service only between Milwaukee and Madison. Simmons extended service into remote areas, with lines established through nearly impenetrable swamps and forests.

Simmons was on the board of directors of the Western Union Telegraph Company. Simmons designed a wooden telegraph insulator and on April 16, 1871, purchased a cheesebox factory that became the Simmons Manufacturing Company to manufacture the insulators.

Simmons Bedding Company 
One of his general store customers paid for merchandise with a patent for a woven wire bedspring. At that time, mattresses were made of cotton or horsehair. Simmons took the ideas from the patent and found a way to make the cost of manufacturing affordable. In 1870, Simmons founded what would become the Simmons Bedding Company, but the market had not yet developed for spring beds. Instead, Simmons manufactured brass beds that were sold domestically and internationally. The Northwestern Wire Mattress Company was incorporated in 1884 and in 1889 the name was changed to Simmons Manufacturing Company. In 1925, Simmons produced the Beautyrest mattress, for which the company is best known. It was sold at three to four times the cost of wire mattresses at the time for $39.50 and four years later had sold more than $9 million of the mattresses. The company introduced the pull-out bed, Hide-a-Bed, in 1940. By 1941, the company made springs, mattresses, steel beds and furniture and employed about 2,500 men. During World War II, it produced 2,700 different products needed to support the war effort.

Manitou and Pike's Peak Railway 
Simmons surveyed the Englemann Canyon for telegraph lines to Pikes Peak in Colorado. He was instrumental in stringing telegraph lines alongside railroads and had earlier purchased a fifty percent interest in a telegraph company. After a miserable two-day trip to the top of the mountain on a mule, he thought that there should be a more comfortable and "civilized" way to make the trip. He got the idea of a train from the owner of a hotel where he was staying.  Simmons then financed the building of the Manitou and Pike's Peak Railway in 1889. The railway itself was built by Italian laborers and was operational by 1891. It can still be ridden to the top.

Political career 
In 1865, Simmons served as the representative of Kenosha County in the Wisconsin State Assembly, serving as a member of the National Union Party.  

He later served as mayor of Kenosha, Wisconsin, from 1884 to 1886, during which time he refunded its debt of $1.75 million.

Personal life 
Simmons married Emma E. Robeson from Lake County, Illinois on April 20, 1850, in Kenosha, Wisconsin. Emma was the daughter of Captain Morris Robeson. Their children were Minnie, Emma, Gilbert, Zalmon and two sons who died during their childhood, Nelson who died at three years of age and Ezra who died when he was 13. Emma and Zalmon were Unitarians.

He built the Gilbert M. Simmons Memorial Library and donated it to the city of Kenosha in memory of his son who had died in 1890. The building, dedicated on May 30, 1900, is listed on the National Register of Historic Places.

Emma died on October 11, 1899. Simmons died on February 11, 1910, in Kenosha, and his son, Zalmon Simmons, Jr. took over the Simmons Manufacturing Company.

See also 
List of mayors of Kenosha, Wisconsin

Notes

References 

1828 births
1910 deaths
Businesspeople from Wisconsin
Mayors of Kenosha, Wisconsin
Members of the Wisconsin State Assembly
People from Montgomery County, New York
Pikes Peak
19th-century American politicians
19th-century American businesspeople